David Bromley (born 1960 in Sheffield, England) is an Australian artist best known for his painting and sculpture, in particular his portraits, and his paintings of children, birds, butterflies and female nudes. He began his career in Adelaide as a potter. He has exhibited widely in Australia, and also in Asia, Europe, Africa and America, and has been a finalist at the Archibald Prize six times.

In May 2013 Bromley married Yuge Yu and they formed Bromley & Co.

Personal
Born in England in 1960, Bromley and his family migrated to Adelaide, South Australia in 1964, spending his early years in Adelaide, and teens and twenties in south-east Queensland.  In his mid-twenties he started working with clay, and painting.

In the 2000s he lived in St Kilda (Melbourne) and established a studio in Daylesford in country Victoria, but in 2012 he auctioned his collection and moved to Byron Bay, moving back to Melbourne in 2013.

He has seven children; Dale (1984), Holly (2003), Daisy (2006) and Arlo (2009) with previous partners, and daughters Wen (2013) and Bei Bel (2016), and son Jimmy (2019) with his wife Yuge.  David, Yuge, Wen, Bei Bel and Jimmy Bromley divide their time between Melbourne and Daylesford.

In 2018 he and his wife bought the heritage listed Old Castlemaine Gaol

Themes and inspiration

David Bromley's artworks include two major bodies of work – the Boys Own adventure project and the Female Nude series.

He takes inspiration from childhood books, popular culture and artists such as Andy Warhol, Roy Lichtenstein and Glen Baxter.

Bromley’s nudes portray the female form in contemporary fashion. He makes use of layering and texturing techniques while employing mediums such as metallic paint and leaf combined with black outlines on bold colours.

Exhibitions

Since the mid-1980s, Bromley has had more than 30 solo exhibitions in Australia, as well exhibiting regularly throughout Europe, the UK, South Africa, Asia and the United States.

Portraits
David Bromley has been an Archibald Prize finalist on six occasions:
 1999 Scott Hicks (film director)
 2000 Dean Lukin (Olympic gold medal weightlifter)
 2001 Long Tom (Artist Long Tom Tjapanangka)
 2002 Charles Blackman (artist)
 2004 McLean & friends (artist McLean Edwards)
 2008 Louise Olsen (fashion designer)

Other portraits include Kate Fischer, Kendall and Kylie Jenner, Miranda Kerr, Kylie Minogue, Poh Ling Yeow, Megan Gale, Kristy Hinze and Hugo Weaving.

Exhibitions

Since the mid-1980s, Bromley has had more than 30 solo exhibitions in Australia, as well exhibiting regularly throughout Europe, the UK, South Africa, Asia and the United States.

Collectability

Bromley has been listed by the Australian Art Collector magazine as one of Australia's 50 most collectible artists (in 2001, 2002 and 2009).

References

External links
David Bromley's website

20th-century Australian painters
20th-century Australian male artists
Australian contemporary artists
Artists from Adelaide
1960 births
Living people
Australian male painters
Artists from Queensland
Artists from Sheffield
English emigrants to Australia